Sonoma State Observatory  is an astronomical observatory owned and operated by Sonoma State University.  It is located in Rohnert Park, California.

See also

List of observatories

References
 

Astronomical observatories in California
Buildings and structures in Sonoma County, California
Sonoma State University